Aššur-nērārī II, inscribed maš-šur-ERIM.GABA (=DÁḪ), "(the god) Aššur is my help," was the king of Assyria, the 68th to appear on the Assyrian Kinglist, ca. 1424–1418 BC or 1414–1408 BC depending on a later uncertainty in the chronology, at the tail end of the Old Assyrian period. The small city state of Aššur was a vassal state of the Mitanni empire at this time and still recovering from their sacking of the city under Šauštatar.

Biography

He was the son of Enlil-nāṣir II, who had preceded him on the Assyrian throne. According to the Khorsabad Kinglist he reigned for seven years, the corresponding columns on the Nassouhi and SDAS Kinglists are damaged at this point. A legal text from Aššur is dated to the “Eponym of Ber-nādin-aḫḫe, son of Aššur-nērārī, supreme judge” and another gives the witness “Šamaš-kidinnu, son of Ibaši-ilu, son of Ber-nādin-aḫḫe, supreme judge.” The title and genealogy suggest Ber-nādin-aḫḫe may have been an otherwise unattested successor to Aššur-nērārī.

He was succeeded by his son, Aššur-bēl-nišešu.

Inscriptions

References

15th-century BC Assyrian kings